Johnsonburg is an unincorporated community and census-designated place (CDP) located within Frelinghuysen Township in Warren County, New Jersey, United States, that was created as part of the 2010 United States Census. As of the 2020 Census, the CDP's population was 381, up from 101 in the 2010 Census.

History
Johnsonburg originated as an important stagecoach stop.  An east-west route carried mail from Dover, New Jersey to Stroudsburg, Pennsylvania, and a north-south route carried mail from Albany, New York to Philadelphia, Pennsylvania.  Both routes crossed at right angles at this location, and a post office and tavern were built.  The tavern became an important meeting place, and elections and caucuses were held there.

A jail was erected in 1753, and the community became known as "Log Gaol" (log jail).  Located at the time in Sussex County, Log Gaol was the county seat from 1753 to 1765.  The county court was also located at Log Gaol.

By 1882, the population had grown to 300.  Johnsonburg had a post office, a large glove factory, and a "good local trade".

The Delaware, Lackawanna and Western Railroad ('DLW') opened Johnsonburg station in Johnsonburg in 1911, along a mainline running between Hoboken, New Jersey and Buffalo, New York.  The railway was important to local dairy farmers, who shipped their products east to Newark and New York City. The historic Lackawanna passenger station has been demolished.

Geography
According to the United States Census Bureau, the CDP had a total land area of 0.196 square miles (0.509 km2), and no water area.

Demographics

Census 2010

References

Census-designated places in Warren County, New Jersey
Frelinghuysen Township, New Jersey